Mia, Liebe meines Lebens, released in Italy as Mia per sempre is a 1998 Italian-German TV mini series starring Claudia Cardinale, Lise Hearns, and Tobias Moretti. It is set in an Irish fishing village.

References

External links

1998 Italian television series debuts
1998 Italian television series endings
1998 German television series debuts
1998 German television series endings
Films set in Ireland
Das Erste original programming